The National Herbarium of Victoria (Index Herbariorum code: MEL) is one of Australia's earliest herbaria and the oldest scientific institution in Victoria. Its 1.5 million specimens of preserved plants, fungi and algae—collectively known as the State Botanical Collection of Victoria—comprise the largest herbarium collection in Australia and Oceania.

The herbarium was established in 1853 by Ferdinand von Mueller, the Government Botanist for Victoria, and is situated within the Royal Botanic Gardens, Melbourne. The present building was constructed in 1934 through a donation from philanthropist Sir Macpherson Robertson. It, along with a 1989 extension, houses the entire collection of 1.5 million plant and fungal specimens. The Herbarium's botanic library is an important source for the history of Australian botany, and has contributed some 124 volumes (of the 1212 volumes contributed by Australia Institutions) to the online digital Biodiversity Heritage Library.

The herbarium is also a partner in the Australasian Virtual Herbarium project, thereby making all of its collection data available to anyone to use. The herbarium also publishes an online key together with descriptions of plants found in Victoria via VicFlora.

Collections
Over half of the existing collection was acquired by Mueller. The herbarium includes the following collections:

 Otto Sonder herbarium
 Fern collections
 Bryophyte collections
 Algae collections
 Lichen collections
 Fungi collections
 Botany of the Burke and Wills expedition

See also
 Louisa Isabella Chaulk Baudinet, 1869, collected specimens; collection includes 97 specimens in MELISR database
 Amelia Bunbury, who collected specimens as Miss A. Pries or A.M. Pries.
 Muelleria (journal), a peer-reviewed botanical journal published by the Royal Botanic Gardens Melbourne
 National Herbarium of New South Wales
 List of Herbaria
 Australasian Virtual Herbarium
 Fungimap
 Past and present staff (not already mentioned)
 Helen Aston
 Tim Entwisle
 Rex Filson
 Teresa Lebel
 Tom May
 Josephine Milne
 Alexander Morrison
 Dan Murphy
 Alastair Robinson
 Jim Willis
 Frank Udovicic

References

External links

 Australasian Virtual Herbarium
 Royal Botanic Gardens Victoria
 VicFlora Flora of Victoria, Royal Botanic Gardens Victoria. Retrieved 18 May 2018.

Herbaria in Australia
1853 establishments in Australia
Buildings and structures in the City of Melbourne (LGA)
Education in Victoria (Australia)
Royal Botanic Gardens Victoria